Paritala Ravindra (30 August 1958 – 24 January 2005), better known as Paritala Ravi, was a politician from the Indian state of Andhra Pradesh. He was a cabinet minister in Andhra Pradesh and a Member of the Legislative Assembly (MLA). He was assassinated by his political rivals in 2005. He started as a communist in the footsteps of his father who donated his land to poor people and later entered electoral politics by joining the Telugu Desam Party. He was elected five times as an MLA from the Penukonda constituency in Anantapur district, Andhra Pradesh.

Early life
Paritala Ravi's father, Paritala Sreeramulu, was a Naxalite leader and was close to Kondapalli Seetharamaiah of the then-monolithic People’s War Group. In 1975, Gangula Narayana Reddy, a factionist, Congress MLA and Sane Chenna Reddy, another factionist, killed Sreeramulu. He was seventeen years old when his father was killed. He, along with his brother, Paritala Hari, escaped the attack.

After losing his father and brother, Ravi wanted to take shelter from his rivals. He went to his maternal uncle, Kondaiah, in Seerpi Kottaala village of Uravakonda Constituency to take shelter. He married his uncle's daughter Sunitha in 1986 and took up cultivation. He had three children. He was one of the accused in the murder of Gangula Narayana Reddy, Narsanna and Yaadi Reddy.

Faction and Politics
After Narayana Reddy was killed, Ramachandra Reddy of the Telugu Desam Party became MLA from Penukonda in 1983 and 1985. In the 1989 elections, the Congress formed the government in the state. Sane Chenna Reddy became MLA of Penukonda by defeating Ramachandra Reddy of the TDP. Ravi wanted to avenge the deaths of his father and brother. He allied himself with Communist Party of India (Marxist–Leninist) People's War (PWG) who were ready to help Ravi and so plotted against Chenna Reddy. Sane Chenna Reddy, who was conspirator in his father's and brother's deaths was killed in Dharmavaram in 1991. By-elections were conducted and Ramana Reddy, son of Chenna Reddy, became MLA in 1991.

Paritala Ravindra was accused in the murder of 7 of MaddelaCheruvu Suri's family members (including women and children) in 1995 via a TV bomb. Ravi allegedly planned the bomb to kill Suri, but Suri escaped.

Maddelacheruvu Suri tried to take vengeance by triggering a remote-controlled car bomb in Jubilee Hills, Hyderabad, in 1997, but missed his target. After his death, his wife Paritala Sunitha became M.L.A from his assembly constituency Penugonda.

Death and post death reaction
On 24 January 2005, hired killers detonated bombs near the Telugu Desam Party (TDP) party office and shot Ravindra. He died instantly.

On 9 November 2008, Joolakanti Srinivas Reddy was assassinated in the Anantapur jail. The main person accused in the case, Maddelacheruvu Suri (Gangula Surya Narayana Reddy), was murdered by his aide Bhanu Kiran on 4 January 2011 in Hyderabad for property disputes. On 18 December 2018 Telangana High Court had sentenced him to life. The court delivered the verdict after examining 133 witnesses, including Paritala's father-in-law Kondanna. The court has convicted 8 accused - Hanumantha Reddy, Peddi Reddy, O.B. Reddy, Vadde Konda, Vadde Srinivasulu, Rekamayya, Narayana Reddy and Ranganayakulu - and the approver was Rammohan Reddy. 4 accused - G B Reddy, Anand Reddy (Rice Mama), Ramaswamy and Patola Govardhan Reddy - have been acquitted.

See also
Rakta Charitra
 List of assassinated Indian politicians

References

1958 births
2005 deaths
Crime in Andhra Pradesh
Assassinated Indian politicians
Telugu politicians
People from Rayalaseema
People from Anantapur district
People murdered in Andhra Pradesh
Telugu Desam Party politicians
Andhra Pradesh MLAs 1983–1985